Seacrest Beach may refer to:

Seacrest Beach, Florida
Seacrest Beach at Dover Beaches North, New Jersey